The Tuapsinsky okrug was a district (okrug) of the Black Sea Governorate of the Caucasus Viceroyalty of the Russian Empire. It bordered the Kuban Oblast to the north, the Novorossiysky okrug to the west, the Sochinsky okrug to the east, and the Black Sea to the south. The area of the Tuapsinsky okrug mostly corresponds to the Krasnodar Krai region of Russia. The district was eponymously named for its administrative centre, Tuapse.

Demographics

Russian Empire Census 
According to the Russian Empire Census, the Tuapsinsky okrug had a population of 9,051, including 5,249 men and 3,802 women. The plurality of the population indicated Russian to be their mother tongue, with significant Ukrainian, Armenian, and Circassian speaking minorities.

Kavkazskiy kalendar 

Notes

References

Bibliography 

Okrugs of Black Sea Governorate
Black Sea Governorate
Caucasus Viceroyalty (1801–1917)
History of Kuban
States and territories disestablished in 1918
1918 disestablishments in Russia